A list of American films released in 1946.

The Best Years of Our Lives won Best Picture at the Academy Awards.

A

B

C

D

E

F

G

H

I

J

K

L

M

N

O

P–Q

R

S

T

U

V

W–Z

Serials

Shorts

See also
 1946 in the United States

References

External links

1946 films at the Internet Movie Database

1946
Films
Lists of 1946 films by country or language